Vecht may refer to:

 Vecht (Utrecht), a Rhine branch in the Netherlands from Utrecht to the IJmeer (Lake IJ) near Muiden, sometimes called Utrechtse Vecht
 Vechtstreek, the region along the above river Vecht
 Vechte, a river that originates in the German state of North Rhine-Westphalia and ends in confluence with river Zwarte Water in the Netherlands province of Overijssel; often called Overijsselse Vecht in Dutch
 Stichtse Vecht, a municipality of the Netherlands in the province of Utrecht
Rosa Vecht (1881–1915), Dutch nurse